Thiago Mendes Rocha (born 11 June 1987), known as Guitta, is a Brazilian futsal player who plays for Sporting CP and the Brazilian national futsal team.

References

External links
A.D.C. Intelli profile

1987 births
Living people
People from Mauá
Futsal goalkeepers
Brazilian men's futsal players
ADC Intelli players
Sporting CP futsal players
Footballers from São Paulo (state)